Nikolai Dmitrjewitsch Dmitrjeff-Orenburgsky or Nikolaj Dmitrievic Dmitriev-Orenburgskij (1 November 1838 in Nizhny Novgorod – 21 April 1898 in Saint Petersburg) was a Russian painter. He spent 1875–1885 living and working in Paris.

Biography
Orenburgsky was one of the fourteen students who decided in 1863 to leave the Imperial Academy of Arts as part of the Revolt of the Fourteen and to form an independent artistic society, the Petersburg Cooperative of Artists (Artel), which preceded the Association of Travelling Art Exhibits, the basis of the peredvizhniki circle.

Orenburgsky is known for the military themes that predominated his work after he participated in the Russo-Turkish War of 1877-78, and for paintings depicting Russian village life (the lives of simple people, the peasants, in specific).
In the project documenting The World's Columbian Exposition of 1893, in which some of his Russian village life paintings were exhibited, it is so commented of Dmitriev-Orenburgsky's work: "A noticeable feature is the air of sadness depicted in scenes of Russian life, even in those which portray its more cheerful phases. Thus in "Sunday in a Village", by Dmitrieff-Orenbursky, where peasants are trying to make merry, we can see that they are only trying, and with indifferent success", and it is commented furthermore: "To stand before this canvas is to have very much the sensation of being set down in a Russian village on a Sunday afternoon".

Dmitriev-Orenburgsky's work is collected and exhibited, inter alia, in the Hermitage Museum, The Russian Museum, the Military Historical Museum and The Museum of Russian Art.

Works

References

External links
Nikolai Dmitriev-Orenburgsky at the wikimedia Commons
Meet the Artist: Nikolai Dmitriev-Orenburgsky, for more detailed biography 
Nikolai Dmitrievich Dmitriev-Orenburgsky at Artnet website.

1838 births
1898 deaths
19th-century painters from the Russian Empire
Russian male painters
Modern artists
Russian war artists
19th-century male artists from the Russian Empire